The 1954 Albanian National Championship was the seventeenth season of the Albanian National Championship, the top professional league for association football clubs, since its establishment in 1930.

Overview
It was contested by 12 teams, and Partizani won the championship.

League standings

Results

References
- List of final tables (RSSSF)

Kategoria Superiore seasons
1
Albania
Albania